Pachytriton granulosus is a species of salamander in the family Salamandridae endemic to the mountains of Zhejiang, China.

References

granulosus